Ján Kožiak (born 13 August 1978) is a Slovak footballer.

References

External links
 

1978 births
Living people
Slovak footballers
Expatriate footballers in Germany
Dynamo Dresden players
Slovak expatriate sportspeople in Germany
FSV Zwickau players
2. Bundesliga players
Slovak expatriate sportspeople in Austria
SV Mattersburg players
Expatriate footballers in Austria

Association football forwards
Expatriate footballers in Lithuania
Slovak expatriate sportspeople in Lithuania
Sportspeople from Košice